Francesco Sizzi, an Italian astronomer who lived during the 17th century, is credited with being the first to notice the annual movement of sunspots.

He also argued against the existence of the Galilean satellites of Jupiter, discovered by Galileo in 1610. In 1611, he published a book, Dianoia astronomica, optica, physica, qua Syderei Nuncij rumor de quatuor planetis à Galilaeo Galilaeo mathematico celeberrimo recens perspicillì cuiusdam ope conspectis, vanus redditur. Auctore Francisco Sitio Florentino, (in Latin; approximate translation of its title: "Understanding of astronomy, optics, and physics, about a rumor in Sidereus Nuncius about the four planets seen by the very celebrated mathematician Galileo Galilei with his telescope, shown to be unfounded."). His main argument was an astrological one (book page 16). In the macrocosm, there are seven planets: two favorable (beneficas) ones, two unfavorable (maleficas) ones, two luminaries, and unique Mercury, erratic and indifferent (vagum & indifferens). In the microcosm, the human head has seven openings: two nostrils, two eyes, two ears, and one mouth. He also noted that there are seven days in the week, seven metals, etc. Given all these corresponding sets of seven, there was clearly no place for the extra planets that Galileo had claimed to have discovered. So they do not exist.

Notes

External links
 "Francesco Sizzi and Correlative Cosmologies"

17th-century Italian astronomers